KXXJ (1330 AM) is a classic hits formatted broadcast radio station licensed to Juneau, Alaska, serving Southeast Alaska.  KXXJ is owned and operated by Alaska Broadcast Communications.  The station can also be heard on 93.3 FM.

History

Launched in 2006 as KTNL.  In 2007, the callsign was changed to KXLJ, which became an affiliate for Air America.  When Air America went under in 2010, KXLJ became an ESPN Radio affiliate.

On May 12, 2011, Seattle Streaming Radio, LLC sold KXLJ to Alaska Broadcast Communications for $250,000.  On July 1, 2011, KXLJ changed formats to classic hits as "1330 KXJ", a "nod" to Los Angeles's KHJ from the 60s and 70s, under new KXXJ calls.

External links

XXJ
Classic hits radio stations in the United States
Radio stations established in 2006
2006 establishments in Alaska